Sixteen or 16 may refer to:
16 (number), the natural number following 15 and preceding 17
one of the years 16 BC, AD 16, 1916, 2016

Films
 Pathinaaru or Sixteen, a 2010 Tamil film
 Sixteen (1943 film), a 1943 Argentine film directed by Carlos Hugo Christensen
 Sixteen (2013 Indian film), a 2013 Hindi film
 Sixteen (2013 British film), a 2013 British film by director Rob Brown

Music
The Sixteen, an English choir
16 (band), a sludge metal band
Sixteen (Polish band), a Polish band

Albums
16 (Robin album), a 2014 album by Robin
 16 (Madhouse album), a 1987 album by Madhouse
Sixteen (album), a 1983 album by Stacy Lattisaw
Sixteen , a 2005 album by Shook Ones
 16, a 2020 album by Wejdene

Songs

"16" (Sneaky Sound System song), 2009
"Sixteen" (Thomas Rhett song), 2017
"Sixteen" (Ellie Goulding song), 2019
"16", by Craig David from Following My Intuition, 2016
"16", by Green Day from 39/Smooth, 1990
"16", by Highly Suspect from MCID, 2019
"Sixteen", by Buzzcocks from Another Music in a Different Kitchen, 1978
"Sixteen", by Demon Hunter from Storm the Gates of Hell, 2007
"Sixteen", by The Flaws from Achieving Vagueness, 2007
"Sixteen", by Funeral for a Friend from The Young and Defenceless and Welcome Home Armageddon, 2010
"Sixteen", by Iggy Pop from Lust for Life, 1977
"Sixteen", by The Indelicates, 2007
"Sixteen", by Le Tigre from This Island, 2004
"Sixteen", by No Doubt from Tragic Kingdom, 1995
"Christine Sixteen", by Kiss, 1977

People 
Earl Sixteen (born 1958), Jamaican reggae singer

Places
Sixteen, Kentucky, an American unincorporated community in Perry County
Sixteen, Montana, an American unincorporated community in Meagher County

Other uses
16 (magazine), a fan magazine marketed to adolescents
6teen, a television series distributed by Teletoon
Number 16 (spider),  world's longest-lived spider
Sixteen (card game), a card game published by Alpine Games
Sixteen (Moesha), a 1996 episode of the comedy-drama series Moesha
Sixteen (restaurant), on the 16th floor of Trump International Hotel and Tower, Chicago
Sixteen (TV series), a 2015 South Korean music competition reality show

See also
List of highways numbered 16